Bernal is an unincorporated community in San Miguel County, New Mexico, United States.

Notes

Unincorporated communities in San Miguel County, New Mexico
Unincorporated communities in New Mexico